Acridocephala is a genus of longhorn beetles of the subfamily Lamiinae, and the sole member of the tribe Acridocephalini, which was described by Dillon and Dillon in 1959. The genus is greatly divergent of the other Lamiini tribes of Ethiopia. The back of members heads and thoraxes and the elytra (or cases of the wings), unlike these other tribes, lie in a single plane. The front of these beetles are very narrowed forms a sharp angle with the vertex. Antenna tubercles are erect and do not diverge.

Species 
This genus includes the following species:

 Acridocephala alboannulata Breuning, 1936
 Acridocephala bifasciata Dillon & Dillon, 1959
 Acridocephala bistriata Chevrolat, 1855
 Acridocephala densepunctata Breuning, 1938
 Acridocephala nicoletii Thomson, 1858
 Acridocephala nubilosa Breuning, 1938
 Acridocephala pulchra Dillon & Dillon, 1959
 Acridocephala seriata Jordan, 1903
 Acridocephala variegata Aurivillius, 1886

References

 
Cerambycidae genera